Logan Lee Long (September 28, 1878 – September 30, 1933) was an American politician in the state of Washington. He served in the Washington House of Representatives from 1915 to 1927. He died in an accident in 1933.

References

Republican Party members of the Washington House of Representatives
People from Pennsylvania
1878 births
1933 deaths